Sarah Vaughan and Billy Eckstine Sing the Best of Irving Berlin is a 1957 studio album featuring Billy Eckstine and Sarah Vaughan, and the songs of Irving Berlin.

Although Vaughan had made many recordings with Eckstine, this was their only complete album together.

Reception

The Allmusic review by Stephen Cook awarded the album four stars and said that "Sometimes surpassing their splendid solo sides, Vaughan and Eckstine obviously revel in each other's company here, seamlessly blending their voices on most every track...A highlight from the land of vintage vocal jazz.".

Track listing
"Alexander's Ragtime Band" – 4:02
"Isn't This a Lovely Day?" – 3:53
"I've Got My Love to Keep Me Warm" – 4:14
"All of My Life" – 3:16
"Cheek to Cheek" – 2:46
"You're Just in Love" – 3:42
"Remember" – 2:19
"Always" – 2:37
"Easter Parade" – 3:14
"The Girl That I Marry" – 2:59
"Now It Can Be Told" – 3:43

All songs written by Irving Berlin.

Personnel
Sarah Vaughan – vocals
Billy Eckstine – vocals and solo on All of My Life and The Girl That I Marry
Hal Mooney – arranger, conductor

References

1957 albums
Vocal duet albums
Sarah Vaughan albums
Billy Eckstine albums
Albums arranged by Hal Mooney
Albums conducted by Hal Mooney
Mercury Records albums
Irving Berlin tribute albums